Per Nyström (21 November 1903 – 3 October 1993) was a Swedish historian, publicist, Social Democrat and governor of Gothenburg and Bohus County 1950–1971.

References
Per Nyström, utgiven av Kungl. Vetenskaps- och Vitterhets-Samhället, Rundqvists Boktryckeri, Göteborg 2005  ISSN 0347-4925

1903 births
1993 deaths
20th-century Swedish historians
Governors of Gothenburg and Bohus County